The 1988 Overseas Final was the eighth running of the Overseas Final as part of the qualification for the 1988 Speedway World Championship Final to be held in Vojens, Denmark. The 1988 Final was held at the Brandon Stadium in Coventry, England on 12 July and was the second last qualifying round for Commonwealth and American riders.

The Top 9 riders qualified for the Intercontinental Final to be held in Vetlanda, Sweden.

1988 Overseas Final
12 July
 Coventry, Brandon Stadium
Qualification: Top 9 plus 1 reserve to the Intercontinental Final in Vetlanda, Sweden

References

See also
 Motorcycle Speedway

1988
World Individual